Charles Henry Morgan (July 5, 1842 – January 4, 1912) was a United States Representative from Missouri, 1875–1879, 1883–1885, 1893–1895, and 1909–1911.

Early life and education
Charles Henry Morgan was born in Cuba, New York on July 5, 1842. His family moved to Pewaukee, Wisconsin, in 1845. He attended Fond du Lac High School in Fond du Lac, Wisconsin, in 1861.

After the Civil War, he went to Albany and graduated from Albany Law School in 1865.

Career

Military career
During the Civil War, he enlisted in the Union Army and rose from Private (rank) to captain in the First Regiment and Twenty-first Regiment, Wisconsin Volunteer Infantry.

During the Spanish–American War he was a lieutenant colonel of the Fifth Missouri Volunteer Infantry.

Law career
He began practicing law in Lamar, Missouri.  In 1868 he was prosecuting attorney of Barton County, Missouri; member of the Missouri House of Representatives in 1872–74. He practiced until 1884, and then he went into coal and zinc mining.

Political career
He served as a Democratic congressman in 1875–79, 1883–85 (during which he was chairman, Committee on Expenditures in the Post Office Department) and 1893–95.  He was elected as a Republican in 1908 and served 1909–1911.

In 1907 he moved to Joplin, Missouri.

Personal life
Morgan married Clara Washburn, daughter of Judge Washburne of Oshkosh, Wisconsin, on March 14, 1877. He had a son, Frank B. Morgan.

Death
Morgan died of pneumonia on January 4, 1912, in Joplin, Missouri. He is interred in Mount Hope Cemetery.

See also

References

External links
Charles Henry Morgan entry at The Political Graveyard

1842 births
1912 deaths
Albany Law School alumni
American military personnel of the Spanish–American War
Members of the Missouri House of Representatives
Missouri lawyers
People from Cuba, New York
People from Lamar, Missouri
Politicians from Joplin, Missouri
People from Pewaukee, Wisconsin
People of Wisconsin in the American Civil War
Union Army soldiers
Democratic Party members of the United States House of Representatives from Missouri
Republican Party members of the United States House of Representatives from Missouri
19th-century American politicians
19th-century American lawyers